The 1948 Australian Grand Prix was a motor race held at the Point Cook Aerodrome, a Royal Australian Air Force base at Point Cook, just outside Melbourne in Victoria, Australia on Australia Day, 26 January 1948. It was staged over 42 laps of a 3.85 kilometre circuit utilizing the runways and service roads of the base. The total race distance was 162 kilometres. The race was organised by the Light Car Club of Australia and was sanctioned by the Australian Automobile Association.

The race was the thirteenth Australian Grand Prix and the first not to be held on a public road circuit. It was staged as a handicap event with the first car starting 18 minutes before the last. Conditions were oppressive, with the temperature topping  by mid-morning, along with hot winds buffeting the exposed pits on the start/finish straight. The overpowering heat, plus the bumpy concrete-slab surface of the runways, took a heavy toll on the competing cars. As well as mechanical retirements, several drivers had to retire due to heat exhaustion.

Prominent motorcycle racer Frank Pratt won the race driving a BMW 328. Alf Najar finished second driving an MG TB Special with Dick Bland placed third in a George Reed constructed Ford V8 special. Bland was also awarded the prize for setting the fastest time.

Classification 

Results as follows.

Notes 
 Fastest lap: Alf Barrett (Alfa Romeo Monza), 1m 48s, 80.00 mph (128.7 km/h)
 Fastest time: Dick Bland (G Reed Ford V8 Special), 1h 26m 52s, 69.62 mph (112.02 km/h)

References

External links
 Motor Cyclist Wins Car Grand Prix, The Age, Tuesday 27 January 1948, Page 4, as archived at trove.nla.gov.au

Grand Prix
Australian Grand Prix
Australian Grand Prix